Lee Sang-kuk is a male former international table tennis player from Korea. 

He won a bronze medal at the 1977 World Table Tennis Championships in the mixed doubles with Lee Ki-won.

See also
 List of table tennis players
 List of World Table Tennis Championships medalists

References

South Korean male table tennis players
Asian Games medalists in table tennis
Table tennis players at the 1978 Asian Games
Medalists at the 1978 Asian Games
Asian Games bronze medalists for South Korea
World Table Tennis Championships medalists